The following lists events that happened during 1956 in the Grand Duchy of Luxembourg.

Incumbents

Events

January – March

April – June
 9 May – Princess Elisabeth marries Franz, Duke of Hohenberg.
 24 May – Representing Luxembourg, Michèle Arnaud appears in the Eurovision Song Contest 1958 with the song Ne crois pas.  No rankings are stated except the winner: Lys Assia of Switzerland.
 10 June – Charly Gaul wins the 1956 Giro d'Italia.

July – September
 27 July - The Constitution of Luxembourg is amended to make the terms of all members of the Chamber of Deputies expire on the first Sunday of June 1959.  As a result, all members would be elected at the same time, rather than in partial elections.

October – December
 29 September - Entry into service of the electrified railway lines between Luxembourg City and Thionville, and Luxembourg City and Arlon.
 25 October - The Constitution of Luxembourg is amended in two places to allow for the delegation of constitutional powers to international organisations, in preparation for the creation of the European Economic Community.
 27 October - The Saar Treaty is signed in Luxembourg, allowing for the transfer of the Saarland to West Germany.

Births
 22 March – Maria Teresa, Grand Duchess of Luxembourg
 11 May - Claude Lenners, composer
 13 August – Gast Waltzing, musician
 5 September – Marianne Majerus, photographer
 13 September – Lucien Lux, politician
 16 October – François Bausch, politician
 17 November – Gaston Reinig, soldier and Chief of Defence

Deaths
 13 March – Albert Simon, illustrator
 21 October – Joseph Laurent Philippe, bishop

Footnotes

References